Risto Krle (September 3, 1900 – October 29, 1975) (born in Struga, present-day North Macedonia during the Ottoman Empire) was a Macedonian playwright and the son of a shoe maker. Many interruptions made his schooling difficult. As a teenager he enrolled in the army where he served until he inherited his father's profession and succeeded as a shoe maker. Many of his plays were written throughout the Second World War and are set preceding or during the First and Second Balkan Wars.

Works
Money is Death (1938) (Macedonian: Парите се Отепувачка, transliterated Parite Se Otepuvačka)
Millions of Martyrs (1940) (Милиони Маченици, Milioni Mačenici)
Antica (1940) (Антица)
Easter (1950) (Великден, Velikden)
Count Milivoj (1958) (Гроф Миливој, Grof Milivoj)
Autobiography (1990) (Автобиографија, Avtobiografija)

References

1900 births
Macedonian dramatists and playwrights
1975 deaths
Yugoslav dramatists and playwrights
People from Struga
Yugoslav writers